The Falésias de Marataízes Natural Monument ) is a municipal Natural monument in the state of Espírito Santo, Brazil.

Location

The Falésias de Marataízes Natural Monument is in the municipality of Marataízes, Espírito Santo.
The monument, in the south of the municipality, protects a landscape of falésias (cliffs) of great scenic beauty along the beach.
The cliffs, made of mudstone, sandstone and conglomerate sediments from the Miocene, are constantly being eroded.
Erosion has caused cracks and gullies in the cliffs and masses of fallen rocks lie at their base.

History

The Falésias de Marataízes Natural Monument was created by municipal decree 193/2008 of 1 December 2008.
It is administered by the municipal environment secretariat.
It became part of the Central Atlantic Forest Ecological Corridor, created in 2002.
In 2010, following approval by the Brazilian Institute of Environment and Renewable Natural Resources (IBAMA), the municipality gave approval for an iron ore shipment terminal to be built in the monument's buffer zone.
In January 2011 it was reported that a lookout and memorial were to be installed on the side of the Rodovia do Sol, with a display on the history of the region.

Notes

Sources

Natural monuments of Brazil
Protected areas of Espírito Santo
2008 establishments in Brazil